Main Street Historic District is a national historic district located at Brevard, Transylvania County, North Carolina.  It encompasses 32 contributing buildings in the central business district of Brevard.  The district developed between about 1874 and 1952 and includes notable examples of Early Commercial, Second Empire, and Classical Revival style architecture. Located in the district are the separately listed McMinn Building and Transylvania County Courthouse.  Other notable buildings include the Lowe Auto Company (c. 1928), Brevard Banking Company (1924), Brevard Drugs/Mull's Grocery (c. 1926), Brevard City Hall and Fire Station (1926), Plummer's Department Store (1911), Brevard Banking Company (1924) designed by Erle Stillwell, Co-ed Theater (1939), Pearlman's (1952), Aethelwold Hotel (1905, c. 1960), and City Market (c. 1905, 1940s).

It was listed on the National Register of Historic Places in 2002.

Gallery

References

Historic districts on the National Register of Historic Places in North Carolina
Second Empire architecture in North Carolina
Neoclassical architecture in North Carolina
Buildings and structures in Transylvania County, North Carolina
National Register of Historic Places in Transylvania County, North Carolina